The Rengat massacre was committed by the Royal Netherlands East Indies Army on 5 January 1949 in Rengat, Riau during Operation Kraai. Following the capture of the town, paratroopers of the Korps Speciale Troepen under lieutenant Rudy de Mey subjected confirmed and suspected TNI militants, civil servants, and ordinary townspeople to looting, rape, and summary execution. Bodies were disposed of in the Indragiri River.

Estimates of the death toll of the Rengat massacre have varied significantly between sources. The Resident of Riau claimed that 400 people had been shot. In turn, the Riau district prosecutor put the death toll at 120 total dead, further reducing the number of victims to "around 80" in his conclusion. This amount has consistently appeared in Dutch official statements since at least 1969. Indonesian sources, including a memorial site on location, estimate a death toll of between 1500 and 2000. Other sources have claimed up to 2600 wounded and dead, including the father of famed author Chairil Anwar.

See also
 Kuta Reh massacre
 South Sulawesi campaign of 1946–1947
 Rawagede massacre

References

Indonesian National Revolution
Conflicts in 1949
1949 in Indonesia
Dutch war crimes
Massacres in Indonesia
Dutch East Indies
Massacres in 1949
January 1949 events in Asia
History of Sumatra
1949 murders in Indonesia